Klinga is a former municipality in the old Nord-Trøndelag county, Norway. The  municipality existed from 1891 until its dissolution in 1964. The municipality encompassed the mainland areas south of the river Namsen in what is now the municipality of Namsos in Trøndelag county. The administrative centre was the village of Bangsund. Other villages in Klinga included Spillum and Klinga where Klinga Church is located.

History

The municipality of Klingen was established on 1 January 1891 when the municipality of Namsos herred was divided in two. The northern part became the municipality of Vemundvik (population: 1,387) and the southern part became the municipality of Klingen (population: 1,387). In 1917, the name of the municipality was changed to Klinga.

During the 1960s, there were many municipal mergers across Norway due to the work of the Schei Committee. On 1 January 1964, the neighboring municipalities of Vemundvik (population: 2,040) and Klinga (population: 2,482) plus the parts of Otterøy municipality located north of the Namsenfjorden (population: 1,013) and the Finnangerodden area on the island of Otterøya in Fosnes municipality (population: 116) were all merged with the town of Namsos (population: 5,224) to create a new (much larger) municipality of Namsos with 10,875 residents.

Name
The municipality (originally the parish) is named after the old Klingen farm. The name is a form of the Old Norse word  which means "circle" or "orb". This name likely refers to the round-shaped mountain located behind the farm site. Historically, the name of the municipality was Klingen until the 20th century when the spelling was changed to Klinga.

Government
While it existed, this municipality was responsible for primary education (through 10th grade), outpatient health services, senior citizen services, unemployment, social services, zoning, economic development, and municipal roads. During its existence, this municipality was governed by a municipal council of elected representatives, which in turn elected a mayor.

Mayors
The mayors of Klinga:

 1891–1907: Halvdan Romstad (V)
 1908–1913: Eirik Spillum (LL)
 1914–1916: Karl Klingen (Rp)
 1917–1922: Ole Schiefloe (LL)
 1923–1925: Nils Christian Pehrson (Ap)
 1926–1939: Martin Tørring (Ap)
 1940–1954: Konrad Aagesen (Ap)
 1955-1955: Arne Kvam (Ap)
 1956–1961: Sverre Lindseth (Ap)
 1962–1963: Alf Derås (Ap)

Municipal council
The municipal council  of Klinga was made up of 15 representatives that were elected to four year terms. The party breakdown of the final municipal council was as follows:

See also
List of former municipalities of Norway

References

Namsos
Former municipalities of Norway
1891 establishments in Norway
1964 disestablishments in Norway